Michelle Allen (née Michelle Harding) is a Canadian curler.

Teams

Women's

Mixed

References

External links

Michelle Allen – Curling Canada Stats Archive

Living people
Canadian women curlers
World curling champions
Canadian women's curling champions
Continental Cup of Curling participants
Year of birth missing (living people)
21st-century Canadian women